The West Shore of the Harrisburg area is a group of western suburbs of Harrisburg, Pennsylvania in proximity to the right bank of the Susquehanna River. This distinct area is located mainly in eastern Cumberland County but also in SE Perry County and far northern York County. The substantial width of the river adjacent to Harrisburg contributes to the local perception of the existence of an East Shore and a West Shore.

The Patriot-News has a West Shore edition for local news and the Pennsylvania Turnpike (Interstate 76) junction with Interstate 83 located just south of New Cumberland in Fairview Township, York County is named the Harrisburg West Shore Interchange. The West Shore Farmers Market is located in Lemoyne. The West Shore School District includes municipalities in Cumberland and York Counties.

List of communities
The communities commonly considered on the West Shore include the following:

Cumberland County
Boroughs:
Camp Hill
Lemoyne
Mechanicsburg
New Cumberland
Shiremanstown
Wormleysburg
Townships:
East Pennsboro
Hampden
Lower Allen
Monroe
Silver Spring
Upper Allen

Perry County
Boroughs:
Duncannon
Marysville
Townships:
Penn
Rye

York County
Boroughs:
Dillsburg
Goldsboro
Lewisberry
York Haven
Townships:
Carroll
Fairview
Monaghan
Newberry

Geography and climate
The West Shore's defining eastern boundary is the Susquehanna River, which separates it from Dauphin County. The three most prominent creeks from north to south are the Sherman Creek, Conodoguinet Creek, and the Yellow Breeches Creek. Each of these drains eastward into the Susquehanna. The county boundaries are natural in the region with Blue Mountain separating Cumberland and Perry Counties and the Yellow Breeches Creek separating Cumberland and York Counties. The climate borders between hot-summer humid continental (Dfa) and humid subtropical (Cfa,) with Cfa found in some lowlands of the Cumberland and York portions. The hardiness zones are 7a and 6b.

Recreation
A significant portion of the recreation opportunities of the Capital Region are located on the West Shore. The Appalachian Trail passes through the Perry County portion. The area also hosts the Capital City Mall and the Williams Grove Speedway in the Cumberland portion.

Economy
Being served by Interstates 76, 81, and 83 and the 581 expressway, the West Shore hosts a number of large employers and a significant amount of Class A office space. Rite Aid Corporation is a major drugstore chain with a major office (formerly the longtime headquarters) in East Pennsboro Township. The US military maintains a strong presence in the Capital Region as an employer, and this includes two facilities on the West Shore: New Cumberland Defense Depot in Fairview Township and Naval Support Activity Mechanicsburg in Hampden Township. Such an ample presence of employers in the area helps keep unemployment consistently lower than the state average and helped make Cumberland County the fastest-growing Pennsylvania county in the past decade according to the 2020 census.

Colleges
Central Penn College, Summerdale
Messiah University, Grantham

References

Geography of Cumberland County, Pennsylvania
Harrisburg–Carlisle metropolitan statistical area
Susquehanna Valley
Geography of Perry County, Pennsylvania
Geography of York County, Pennsylvania